Buffalo Springfield Again is the second album by Buffalo Springfield, released on Atco Records in November 1967. It peaked at #44 on the Billboard 200. In 2003, the album was ranked number 188 on Rolling Stone magazine's list of the 500 greatest albums of all time, maintaining the rating in a 2012 revised list. The album was included in Robert Christgau's "Basic Record Library" of 1950s and 1960s recordings—published in Christgau's Record Guide: Rock Albums of the Seventies (1981)—and in Robert Dimery's 1001 Albums You Must Hear Before You Die.  It was voted number 165 in Colin Larkin's All Time Top 1000 Albums in 2000.

Background
Unlike the band's debut album, which had been recorded fairly quickly during the summer of 1966, recording for this album took place over a protracted nine-month span during 1967. Several factors may have contributed to this, including that bassist Bruce Palmer had been deported in January and had re-entered the United States illegally to continue working with the band, and guitarist Neil Young had quit and rejoined the group on several occasions, notably absent for the band's appearance at the famed Monterey Pop Festival where David Crosby substituted in his place at the request of guitarist Stephen Stills.

The album features the first recordings of songs written by guitarist Richie Furay, who had not contributed any material to the band's debut album. Also unlike the previous record, which had been recorded in its entirety by the band proper, session musicians appeared on various tracks as indicated on the album's inner sleeve. Palmer's deportation issues necessitated the contributions of outside bass players. During one of the times that Young had left the band, he had booked a studio to record "Expecting to Fly," with the outside musicians under the impression it was for a Neil Young solo project rather than for Buffalo Springfield. Phil Spector Wrecking Crew associate Jack Nitzsche provided the musical arrangements for "Expecting to Fly"; it does not feature any members of the Springfield. Nitzsche would continue to work with Young through the early 1970s on both his solo debut album and his best-selling Harvest, also becoming a member of Young's backing bands Crazy Horse and The Stray Gators.

The album includes an early country rock track by Furay, "A Child's Claim to Fame." The track "Rock & Roll Woman" allegedly includes vocals by Crosby, who also allegedly had a hand in its composition; whether true or not, Stills acknowledges the genesis of the song was from jamming with Crosby.  Cash Box said of "Rock & Roll Woman" that it's a "mid-tempo rock ballad" and that "throaty vocals with a shimmering group backing are spiced with some outstanding guitar showing." Young's extended piece "Broken Arrow" begins with audience applause (taken not from a Buffalo Springfield show, but rather from a concert by the Beatles) and the opening of "Mr. Soul" (which opens the album) recorded live in the studio. The back cover of the album includes a lengthy list of people thanked as influence and inspiration; some may be musicians appearing but uncredited. The album is dedicated to Barry Friedman, and listed as a York/Pala production. The album was remastered for compact disc in HDCD and reissued on June 24, 1997.

Track listing
"Mr. Soul" (Neil Young) – 2:48
 Recorded January 9 & April 4, 1967. Lead vocal: Neil Young. Backing vocal and guitar: Richie Furay, Stephen Stills.
"A Child's Claim to Fame" (Richie Furay) – 2:09
 Recorded June 21, 1967, Columbia Recording Studios, Los Angeles, California. Lead vocal: Richie Furay. Dobro: James Burton.
"Everydays" (Stephen Stills) – 2:38
 Recorded March 15, Gold Star Studios, Los Angeles, California. Lead vocal: Stephen Stills. Bass: Jim Fielder. (Bruce Palmer absent).
"Expecting to Fly" (Young) – 3:39
 Recorded May 6, 1967, Sunset Sound, Los Angeles, California. Lead vocal: Neil Young. Arrangement: Jack Nitzsche. (Rest of group absent).
"Bluebird" (Stills) – 4:28
 Recorded April 4, 1967, Sunset Sound, Los Angeles, California. Lead vocal: Stephen Stills. Bass: Bobby West. Banjo: Charlie Chin. (Bruce Palmer absent).
"Hung Upside Down" (Stills) – 3:24
 Recorded June 30 & September 1–5, 1967, Columbia Recording Studios & Sunset Sound, Los Angeles, California. Lead vocals: Richie Furay (verses); Stephen Stills (choruses).
"Sad Memory" (Furay) – 3:00
 Recorded September 5, 1967, Sunset Sound, Los Angeles, California. Lead vocal: Richie Furay. Electric lead guitar: Neil Young. Acoustic guitar: Richie Furay. (Stills, Palmer, and drummer Dewey Martin absent).
"Good Time Boy" (Furay) – 2:11
 Recorded August 1967, Sunset Sound, Los Angeles, California. Lead vocal: Dewey Martin. Reports differ on whether drummer Martin actually played drums on this track, or whether it was played entirely by session musicians, including the Memphis Horns.
"Rock & Roll Woman" (Stills) – 2:44
 Recorded June 22, August 8, October 3, 1967, Sunset Sound, Los Angeles, California. Lead vocal: Stephen Stills. Background vocal: David Crosby (disputed; he is, however, an uncredited co-writer of the melody). Guitar: Doug Hastings.
"Broken Arrow" (Young) – 6:11
 Recorded August 25 & September 5–18, 1967, Columbia Recording Studios & Sunset Sound, Los Angeles, California. Lead vocal: Neil Young. Piano, organ: Don Randi. Guitar: Chris Sarns.

Personnel 
Buffalo Springfield
 Stephen Stills – vocals, guitars, keyboards
 Neil Young – vocals, guitars
 Richie Furay – vocals,  rhythm guitar
 Bruce Palmer – bass guitar
 Dewey Martin – vocals, drums

Additional personnel
 James Burton – Dobro on "A Child's Claim to Fame"
 Chris Sarns – guitar on "Broken Arrow"
 Charlie Chin – banjo on "Bluebird"
 Jack Nitzsche – electric piano on "Expecting to Fly"
 Don Randi – piano on "Expecting to Fly" and "Broken Arrow"
 Jim Fielder – bass on "Everydays"
 Bobby West – bass on "Bluebird"
 The American Soul Train – horn section on "Good Time Boy"

Uncredited possible additional personnel
 Jim Horn – clarinet
 Norris Badeaux – baritone saxophone
 Doug Hastings, Russ Titelman – guitars
 Carol Kaye – bass
 Hal Blaine, Jim Gordon – drums
 Merry Clayton, Patrice Holloway, Gloria Jones, Shirley Matthews, Harvey Newmark, Gracia Nitzsche – backing vocals

Production personnel
 Ahmet Ertegun, Richie Furay, Charles Greene, Dewey Martin, Jack Nitzsche, Stephen Stills, Brian Stone, Neil Young – producers
 Bruce Botnick, Bill Lazarus, Jim Messina, Ross Myering – engineers
 Loring Eutemey – design
 Eve Babitz – cover illustration
 Tim Mulligan – HDCD digital mastering
 John Nowland, Pflash Pflaumer – analog to digital transfers

Charts

References

Buffalo Springfield albums
1967 albums
Albums produced by Jack Nitzsche
Atco Records albums
Albums produced by Richie Furay
Albums produced by Stephen Stills
Albums produced by Neil Young
Albums recorded at Gold Star Studios
Albums recorded at Sunset Sound Recorders